is a former Japanese football player. He played for Japan national team.

Club career
Matsunaga was educated at and played for Hamana High School and Aichi Gakuin University. After graduating from the university, he joined Nissan Motors (later Yokohama Marinos) in 1985. The club also won 1985 Emperor's Cup. From 1988 to 1990, the club won all three major title in Japan; Japan Soccer League, JSL Cup and Emperor's Cup for 2 years in a row. In 1990s, the club won 1990 JSL Cup, 1991 Emperor's Cup and 1992 Emperor's Cup. In Asia, the club won 1991–92 Asian Cup Winners' Cup.

When Japan's first-ever professional league J1 League started in 1993, Nissan Motors was transformed to Yokohama Marinos for whom he continued to play. The club won 1992 Emperor's Cup and 1992–93 Asian Cup Winners' Cup. After he lost his position to young Yoshikatsu Kawaguchi who would also replace him as the first-choice goalkeeper in the national team, he moved to Japan Football League (JFL) side Tosu Futures in 1995. He moved to fellow JFL side Brummell Sendai in 1997. He came back to J1 League to play for Kyoto Purple Sanga in 1998 and spent 3 seasons there before he retired in 2000.

National team career
Matsunaga was capped 40 times for Japan national team between 1988 and 1995. He was the first-choice GK when Japan won the 1992 Asian Cup. However, he was sent off for retaliation in the semi-final against China and Kazuya Maekawa filled in for him for the rest of the competition. He was also tending the goal when Japan's hope to play in the 1994 World Cup finals was dashed by a late Iraqi equaliser in the 1994 World Cup qualification final qualifier, the match that the Japanese fans now refer to as the Agony of Doha.

Coaching career
After retiring from the game, Matsunaga served as a goalkeeping coach for Kyoto Purple Sanga from 2001 to 2006. He is now a goalkeeping coach for Yokohama F. Marinos.

Club statistics

National team statistics

Personal honours
J.League Best XI – 1993
J.League Meritoriousness Player Award – 2000

Team honours
National Team
AFC Asian Cup – 1992

Nissan Motors / Yokohama Marinos
Asian Cup Winners' Cup – 1991/92, 1992/93
Japan Soccer League Division 1 – 1988/89, 1989/90
Emperor's Cup – 1985, 1988, 1989, 1991, 1992
JSL Cup – 1988, 1989, 1990

References

External links

 
 Japan National Football Team Database
 

1962 births
Living people
Aichi Gakuin University alumni
Association football people from Shizuoka Prefecture
Japanese footballers
Japan international footballers
Japan Soccer League players
J1 League players
Japan Football League (1992–1998) players
Yokohama F. Marinos players
Sagan Tosu players
Vegalta Sendai players
Kyoto Sanga FC players
1992 AFC Asian Cup players
1995 King Fahd Cup players
AFC Asian Cup-winning players
Association football goalkeepers